Raymond Herbaux (22 October 1919 – 21 March 1989) was a French weightlifter. He competed in the men's light-heavyweight event at the 1948 Summer Olympics.

References

1919 births
1989 deaths
French male weightlifters
Olympic weightlifters of France
Weightlifters at the 1948 Summer Olympics
Sportspeople from Lille